Marcetelli is a  (municipality) in the Province of Rieti in the Italian region of Latium, located about  northeast of Rome and about  southeast of Rieti.

Marcetelli borders the following municipalities: Ascrea, Collalto Sabino, Collegiove, Paganico Sabino, Pescorocchiano, Varco Sabino.

By number of inhabitants it is the smallest municipality in Lazio and among the smallest in Italy.

References

External links
 Official website

Cities and towns in Lazio